Al-Ha'ir Prison, ( also known as al-Hayer al-Hayar or al-Haer), is a Saudi Arabian political, maximum-security, Mabahith-affiliated prison located approximately 25 miles south of Riyadh. It is the largest prison complex in Saudi Arabia and houses both men and women. Facilities include isolation cells, and physical torture rooms.  Reportedly,  a number of members of al-Qaeda are held there. There is also confirmation of unfavored royal family members being held there which include princess and princes, journalists, business rivals,  political rivals, international prisoners or any alleged dissidents or persons deemed worthy of needing be silenced, made an example of, and destroyed psychologically and physically.  Many people have been held without charge, have no current, pending, or even past court dates, nor future release date. Past prisoners report being subject to constant psychological, environmental, physical, social and sexual torture.  Many noted persons are confirmed to be held there under these conditions and many other individuals suspected to be there, as the Saudi government limits communication for captives and refuse to provide information concerning certain detainees as a policy.

Prison conditions
According to historycollection.co, "In September 2003 the prison was ravaged by a fire which killed 67 inmates and injured more than 20 others held in the prison, as well as three security guards."

In 2015, journalist Kevin Sullivan of The Washington Post visited al-Ha'ir prison, including one cell that looked "spartan but clean", in which an inmate described the conditions as "good". Sullivan's host described the prison as illustrating the "government’s strategy of showering inmates with perks rather than locking them down in harsh, Guantanamo Bay-style conditions". Gary Hill of the International Corrections and Prisons Association spent over two decades visiting Saudi Arabia advising on prison warden training and stated to Sullivan that he expected prisoners in Saudi Arabian prisons "to be treated nicely — that's their religion". , Hill had never visited any Saudi prison. Sullivan also interviewed Ministry of Interior spokesman Mansour al-Turki, who stated that the recidivism rate for terrorist incidents by ex-detainees was twenty percent, and Sevag Kechichian of Amnesty International, who stated that "allegations of mistreatment and torture of prisoners in Saudi prisons are widespread" and that "torture can still happen even in nice-looking prisons — when no one is looking".

Notable inmates

 William Sampson, a British-Canadian man tortured and kept in solitary confinement for 31 months, and Sandy Mitchell, one of Sampson's co-accused, were detained from 2001 to 2003.
 Mohammad Al-Harbi, a Saudi high-school teacher who was accused of mocking religion and sentenced to three years' imprisonment and 750 lashes.
 Hani al-Sayegh, a Saudi controversially accused of complicity in the Khobar towers bombing, was detained starting from 2000.
 Prince Al-Waleed bin Talal, a billionaire Saudi investor who was detained during the 2017 Saudi Arabian purge and initially held at The Ritz-Carlton, Riyadh.
 Eleven princes of the House of Saud were detained at al-Ha'ir on 6 January 2018, after they publicly protested in opposition to a new government policy requiring royal family members to pay their own electricity and water bills and with a request for monetary compensation for a death sentence against one of their cousins.
Loujain al-Hathloul released from jail 10 February 2021.
 Princess Basmah bint Saud bin Abdulaziz al-Saud, a 56-year-old Saudi royal family member was detained in March 2019 without any charges, as per her claims.

Lawsuit
In October 2004, former detainees William Sampson, Sandy Mitchell and Les Walker, part of a group of nine foreign nationals convicted of bombing, terrorism and espionage (and subsequently released on royal pardon) were given permission by the Court of Appeal of England and Wales to sue for redress for wrongful conviction and torture. Named in the suit were:
 Prince Naif, Minister of Interior
 Mohammed Said, governor of al-Ha'ir Prison
 Ibrahim al-Dali, officer of the Mabahith (the Saudi Arabian general intelligence service)
 Khaled al-Saleh, officer of the Mabahith

In 2006 this judgement was overturned by the Law Lords, and the plaintiffs appealed to the European Court of Human Rights.

See also
Human rights in Saudi Arabia

References

External links
 CBC News: Inside a Saudi Prison
 World Tribune - Fire in the Prison in 2003 
 "Jailing Jihadis: Saudi Arabia’s Special Terrorist Prisons" at Global Terrorism Analysis

Prisons in Saudi Arabia